Dewas District is a district in the Indian state of Madhya Pradesh. The town of Dewas is the district headquarters.

Dewas District roughly corresponds to the territories of the twin Maratha princely states of Dewas - Junior & Senior. The district straddles the Vindhya Range; the northern portion of the district lies on the Malwa plateau, while the southern portion lies in the valley of the Narmada River. The Narmada forms the southern boundary of the district. The district is bounded to the east by Sehore District, to the south by the Harda and Khandwa districts, to the west by the Khargone and Indore districts, and to the north by the Ujjain and Shajapur districts. Dewas District is part of Ujjain Division. Devsaal Rawats of Uttarakhand are said to have their origins in Dewas at the time of legendary king Vikramāditya.

Etymology
The district takes its name from the district headquarters town, Dewas, which is said to have been derived on the basis of two traditions. One is that Dewas lies at the base of a  conical hill, known as Chamunda hill, on top of which the shrine of Chamunda is located. The image of the goddess is cut into the wall of a cave, known as Devi Vashini or the goddess's residence. From this, the name Dewas (dev-vas) seems to have been derived. The other view of the probable origin is from the name of the founder of the city, Dewasa Bania.

History 

Dewas was formerly two separate Maratha princely states of British India (Dewas Junior) and (Dewas Senior). The original state was founded in the first half of the 18th century by the brothers - Jivaji Rao (Junior) and Tukaji Rao (Senior), from the Puar clan of Marathas. They had advanced into Malwa with the Maratha Peshwa, Baji Rao, in 1728. The brothers divided the territory among themselves and their descendants ruled as the senior and junior branches of the family. After 1841, each branch ruled its own portion as a separate state, though the lands belonging to each were intimately entangled. Both Dewas States were in the Malwa Agency of the Central India Agency.

Dewas Junior & Senior Darbars (Courts) were composed of Sardars, Mankaris, Istamuradars, Thakurs and Jagirdars.

After India's independence in 1947, the Rajas of Dewas acceded to India, and their states were integrated into Madhya Bharat, which became a state of India in 1950. Later, in 1956, Madhya Bharat was merged into Madhya Pradesh state.

Geography

Dewas district lies in west Madhya Pradesh on the level plains of the Malwa plateau. To the south, the land rises gently to the Vindhya Range, which is the source of the Chambal and Kali Sindh rivers that flow north through the district on their way to the Ganges.

Climate 
Due of its high elevation and inland location, even during the hottest months of the year, the nights are relatively cool, which is known as Shab-e-Malwa. Three distinct seasons are observed: summer, monsoon and winter. Dewas gets most of its rainfall during July–September due to the southwest monsoon.

Places of interest

Pushpgiri Tirth, Sonkatch
The temple here is dedicated to Lord Mahavir. This Jain kshetra is a sprawling 250-acre complex housing Jain Sthanaks, schools, hospital, museum, cottages, shopping center and a  idol of Bhagwan Paraswanath in an Yogic (Padmasan) posture, one of the tallest Jain idols.

Kheoni wildlife Sanctuary

According to a bird survey done in April 2018, Kheoni has around 125 species of birds, including the state bird of Madhya Pradesh, the Indian paradise flycatcher.

Kavadia Hills

These are a series of hills, situated next to Potla and Pipri villages in Bagli Taluk of Dewas district. There are total seven mountain-like formations of shaped, interlocking, basalt columns that were probably created simultaneously as a result of volcanic eruption millions of years ago. These rock columns are arranged in a pattern that gives an appearance of a man-made structure. Most of the columns are hexagonal and interlocked with similar rocks on all the edges that emit a musical sound when struck. Most visible columns are 8 to 10 feet long but there can be longer rocks further deep inside the mountain. Although basalt columns are not unique and are found at several places around the world (including St. Mary's Islands in Karnataka, India), the quality, quantity, geometrical arrangement and location (far from an ocean) of this place is unique.

Gidya Khoh
Situated on the Indore-Nemawar road, Gidya Khoh or Gidiya Khoh lies in the Dewas District, and has a waterfall surrounded by a valley. The waterfall cascades from a height of 500–600 ft. Khudel devta temple is located here.

Dewas' water management programs
The United Nations awarded Dewas district's community water management works the 3rd place under the category of "Best Water Management Practices" for 2011–2012. The United Nations also praised Bhagirath Krishhak Abhiyan of Dewas district, started by district administrator Umakant Umrao. A documentary film made by Public Service Broadcasting Trust about Dewas water revolution was featured on Lok Sabha TV.

Divisions 

Dewas District is divided into eight tehsils: Sonkatch, Dewas, Bagli, Kannod, Tonk Khurd, Khategaon, Hatpiplya and Satwas. Dewas tehsil is situated on the north-western part of the district, Sonkatch on the north-eastern part, Bagli on the south, Kannod on the south-central part and Khategaon on the South-east. Dewas, the headquarters of Dewas tehsil, and the district headquarters, is situated on National Highway and is also connected by broad-gauge railway line of western Railway.

The district contributes 5 seats to the Madhya Pradesh Vidhan Sabha: Dewas, Sonkatch, Hatpipliya, Bagli and Khategaon.

Dewas is also spread across 3 Lok Sabha constituencies: Dewas (Sonkatch, Dewas, Tonk Khurd and Hatpipliya tehsils), Khandwa (Bagli and Satwas tehsils) and Vidisha (Khategoan and Kannod tehsils)

Transport 
In terms of roadways, NH-47 passes through the southern parts of the district and NH-52 passes through Dewas city. In addition, there are State Highways and other district highways within the district.
The district has 3 railway stations, of which Dewas Junction (DWX), gets the most passenger traffic. It is a part of Ratlam Division of the Western Railway Zone.

Demographics

This gives it a ranking of 319th in India (out of a total of 640). Its population growth rate over the decade 2001-2011 was  19.48%. Dewas has a sex ratio of 941 females for every 1000 males, and a literacy rate of 70.53%. 28.89% of the population lives in urban areas. Scheduled Castes and Scheduled Tribes make up 18.67% and 17.44% of the population respectively.

Languages

As of the 2011 census, 55.51% of the population in the district spoke Hindi, 32.73% Malvi, 3.10% Nimadi, 1.90% Urdu, 1.31% Gondi, 1.08% Bareli  and 0.91% Bhili as their first language.

References

External links

Dewas District web site
Dewas City Map

 
Districts of Madhya Pradesh